Charalampos "Charis" Giannopoulos (Greek: Χαράλαμπος "Χάρης" Γιαννόπουλος; born July 13, 1989) is a Greek professional basketball player and the team captain for Kolossos Rodou of the Greek Basket League. He is a 2.01 m (6 ft 7 in) tall small forward.

Professional career
Giannopoulos began his pro career with the Greek League club PAOK Thessaloniki, during the 2005–06 season. He joined the Greek club Olympiacos Piraeus in 2008. He moved to Panionios for 2 seasons, from 2009 to 2011. He joined Peristeri for the 2011–12 season. He then moved to Panathinaikos for the 2012–13 season. 

In 2013, he signed with the Spanish League club Bàsquet Manresa. In 2015, Giannopoulos returned to Greece, signing with Rethymno Cretan Kings. On July 10, 2017, Giannopoulos renewed his contract with the Cretan team through 2020, and also became the club's team captain.

In 2018, Giannopoulos signed with AEK Athens of the Greek Basket League. He parted ways with the team on June 21, 2020. During his stint with AEK, Giannopoulos won the 2019 FIBA Intercontinental Cup as well as the 2020 Greek Cup.

On July 28, 2020, Giannopoulos moved to Promitheas Patras. In 27 games during his first season, he averaged 8.7 points, 3.7 rebounds and 1 assist per contest. On March 23, 2022, he parted ways with the club, after an injury-plagued second season, where he appeared in only 9 games and averaged 7.4 points, 2.1 rebounds and 1.2 assists per contest. 

On April 8, 2022, despite an initial agreement with AEK Athens, Giannopoulos returned to another former club of his, Peristeri, for the rest of the season. In 2 regular season games, he received limited playing time, while never appearing on court in the team's two playoff matches against Olympiacos.

On August 17, 2022, Giannopoulos moved to Kolossos Rodou.

National team career

Greek junior national team
With Greece's junior national teams, Giannopoulos played at the 2005 FIBA Europe Under-16 Championship and the 2006 FIBA Europe Under-18 Championship. He won the silver medal at the 2007 FIBA Europe Under-18 Championship. He also played at the 2008 FIBA Europe Under-20 Championship, and won the gold medal at the 2009 FIBA Europe Under-20 Championship.

Greek senior national team
Giannopoulos became a member of the senior men's Greek national basketball team in 2017. He played at the 2019 FIBA World Cup qualification.

Career statistics

Domestic Leagues

Regular season

|-
| 2016–17
| style="text-align:left;"| Rethymno Cretan Kings
| align=center | GBL
| 25 || 27.2 || .464 || .398 || .889 || 3.9 || 1.5 || .6 || .1 || 10.4
|-
| 2017–18
| style="text-align:left;"| Rethymno Cretan Kings
| align=center | GBL
| 26 || 26.0 || .366 || .378 || .938 || 3.0 || 1.4 || .7 || .2 || 10.9
|-
| 2018–19
| style="text-align:left;"| A.E.K.
| align=center | GBL
| 21 || 12.4 || .398 || .375 || .692 || 1.4 || .4 || .5 || .1 || 4.6
|}

FIBA Champions League

|-
| style="text-align:left;" | 2018–19
| style="text-align:left;" | A.E.K.
| 16 || 8.0 || .333 || .227 || .778 || 1.5 || .1 || .1 || .1 || 2.3
|}

Honours
Greek Basketball Super Cup: (2020)

References

External links
Euroleague.net Profile
FIBA Europe Profile
Eurobasket.com Profile
Greek Basket League Profile
Hellenic Federation Profile 
Spanish League Profile 
Draftexpress.com Profile

1989 births
Living people
AEK B.C. players
Bàsquet Manresa players
Greek expatriate basketball people in Spain
Greek men's basketball players
Kolossos Rodou B.C. players
Liga ACB players
Obradoiro CAB players
Olympiacos B.C. players
Panathinaikos B.C. players
Panionios B.C. players
P.A.O.K. BC players
Sportspeople from Alexandreia, Greece
Peristeri B.C. players
Promitheas Patras B.C. players
Rethymno B.C. players
Small forwards